Taabinga is a rural town and locality in the South Burnett Region, Queensland, Australia.

History 
The town takes its name from the Taabinga pastoral run occupied by pastoralist Charles Robert Haly circa 1849, using Waka language word, Bujiebara dialect, dha-bengga indicating place of jumper ants.

Taabinga Village Provisional School opened on 10 August 1897. On 1 January 1909, it became Taabinga Village State School. It closed on 16 July 1961 and the students transferred to the new Taabinga State School.

St Paul's Anglican church was dedicated in 1904. It closed in 1910. The church building was moved to Taabinga Village.

Erin Vale State School opened in 1911, but was renamed Stuart Valley State School in 1912. It closed in 1961. It was at approx 15 Toomeys Road to the east of the Stuart River.

Taabinga Road State School opened circa August 1924. On 1 November 1924, it was renamed Boonyouin State School. It closed in 1953.

Taabinga State School opened in July 1961 with the students pupils transferred from the closing Taabinga Village State School. It is now within the locality boundaries of Kingaroy.

References

External links 
 
 

Towns in Queensland
South Burnett Region
Localities in Queensland